Abay may refer to:

People
Abay (name)

Places
Abay District, East Kazakhstan, Kazakhstan
Abay District, Karagandy Province, Kazakhstan
Abay (town), the province's administrative center
Abay, Almaty, Kazakhstan
Abay, Aktobe, a village in the Aktobe Province of western Kazakhstan
Abay, Taşköprü, a village in Turkey
 Abay Chomen, an administrative division in the Oromia Region of Ethiopia
Gish Abay, a town in west-central Ethiopia
Alexandria Bay, a village in Upstate New York, United States, on the Saint Lawrence River affectionately referred to as Abay

Other uses
Abay (Almaty Metro), a station of the Line 1 of the Almaty Metro
Abay Opera House, opera and ballet house in Kazakhstan
Abay Siti, Somali female institution dating back to early 19th century
Lesser Abay River, a river of central Ethiopia
Tikur Abay Transport, an Ethiopian football club
 Abay (novel), a novel by Kazakh writer Mukhtar Auezov
 Abay (film), a 1995 Kazakhstani biographic film that tells Abay Qunanbayuli's life

See also
Abai (disambiguation)

et:Abai
kk:Абай
lt:Abajus
ru:Абай